Joseph Gerson is an American peace and disarmament activist. He is president of the Campaign for Peace, Disarmament and Common Security and vice-president of the International Peace Bureau.  Since 1976 he has served the American Friends Service Committee as director of the Peace and Economic Security Program.

Early life and education 
Gerson was born in Plainfield, New Jersey. He earned a bachelor of Science in Foreign Service at Georgetown University and received his Doctorate in Politics and International Security Studies from the Union Institute.

Activism 
He started his activism during his years as a student at Georgetown University. He participated on the 1967 March on the Pentagon. He is member of the international Steering committee of the Global Campaign on Military Spending and the Not to War no to Nato network.

Publications 

 Empire and the Bomb: How the US Uses Nuclear Weapons to Dominate the World
 The Sun Never Sets...Confronting the Network of U.S. Foreign Military Bases
 With Hiroshima Eyes: Atomic War, Nuclear Extortion and Moral Imagination.

See also 
American Friends Service Committee
Pacifism in the United States
List of peace activist

References

External links 
Campaign for Peace, Disarmament and Common Security

Living people
Walsh School of Foreign Service alumni
People from Plainfield, New Jersey
Year of birth missing (living people)